Kerry Szeps Wood (born April 13, 1978) is an American politician who serves in the Connecticut House of Representatives representing the 29th district in Hartford County.

Political career

Election
Wood was elected in the general election on November 6, 2018, winning 56 percent of the vote over 44 percent of Republican candidate Andrew Lanciotto.

References

 Connecticut Democrats
Wood, Kerry Szeps 
Living people
21st-century American politicians
21st-century American women politicians
Women state legislators in Connecticut
1978 births